The Fare network (formerly Football Against Racism in Europe) is a network set up to counter discrimination in European football. The network was set up in Vienna, Austria, in February 1999 after a meeting of football supporters' groups, football players' unions and football associations. The network has received backing from the European governing body UEFA, FIFA and the European Commission for its aims.

See also
Football Supporters Europe

References

External links
 

Racism in association football
Anti-racist organizations in Europe
Organizations established in 1999
Association football supporters
1999 establishments in Austria